Just Say Jesus is the second studio album by Christian rock band 7eventh Time Down, released on September 3, 2013 by BEC Recordings. This album saw chart successes and  positive critical reception.

Background
The album was released by BEC Recordings on September 3, 2013.

Critical reception

Just Say Jesus garnered generally positive reception from music critics to critique the album. Andy Argyrakis of CCM Magazine said that the album has "a lot  to devour musically," and that the band "brings an immediate lyrical ." At Louder Than the Music, Jono Davies told that "there is something for everyone here." Kelcey Wixtrom of CM Addict noted the same sentiment, which Wixtrom stated that the release "will appeal to a wide audience." At Indie Vision Music, Jonathan Andre called it "an enjoyable and heartfelt album!"

Commercial performance
For the Billboard charting week of September 21, 2013, Just Say Jesus was the No. 11 most sold album in the breaking and entry chart of the United States known as Top Heatseekers and it was the No. 16 Top Christian Album as well.

Track listing

Charts

References

2013 albums
7eventh Time Down albums
BEC Recordings albums